Francis Cahill ( 1882 – 19 October 1957) was an Irish nationalist, teacher and politician. Prominently associated with the Gaelic League, the Irish Republican Brotherhood (IRB) and the Irish-Ireland movement. A teacher by profession Frank taught for 50 years in St Laurence O'Toole C.B.S., Seville Place, Dublin.

A close friend of Arthur Griffith and Seán O'Casey as well as the leaders of the Easter rising Tom Clarke and Seán Mac Diarmada, Cahill was dedicated to the cause of Irish independence and Gaelic revival.

In 1901 he founded the St. Laurence O'Toole Gaelic Athletic Club and would go on in 1910 to form the St. Laurence O'Toole Pipe Band and drama group with Seán O'Casey.

In 1928 he led the way in setting up Primary Schools' League GAA (Cumann na mBunscol) to promote Gaelic culture.

Having been an Alderman for Sinn Féin on Dublin Corporation for several years Cahill was elected to Dáil Éireann as a Cumann na nGaedheal Teachta Dála (TD) for the Dublin North constituency at the 1923 general election. He resigned his seat on 30 October 1924 following the Irish Army Mutiny and, along with several other members of the Dáil, formed the National Party. In 1925 he was nominated for the Seanad but was not elected.

After retirement from teaching an inter-county senior football testimonial match between Meath and Louth was held at Croke Park to recognise Frank's life of service to the national game.

On his death in 1957 the Frank Cahill memorial committee was formed to recognize his contributions to the GAA and Parish. A GAA trophy (The Frank Cahill Cup), awarded at primary level, was named after Cahill and a plaque and statue of Our Lady of Lourdes was erected in the grounds of St. Laurence O'Toole's church, North Wall.

References

1880s births
1957 deaths
Burials at St. Fintan's Cemetery, Sutton
Cumann na nGaedheal TDs
Early Sinn Féin politicians
Founders of Gaelic games institutions
Irish schoolteachers
Irish sportsperson-politicians
Members of the 4th Dáil
Politicians from County Dublin